Kaki Bukit MRT station is an underground Mass Rapid Transit station on the Downtown line in Bedok planning area, Singapore, located along Kaki Bukit Avenue 1, near the junction with Jalan Damai. The station serves both the industrial and residential areas in the Kaki Bukit district.

This station provides an alternative to Eunos and Bedok stations on the East West line.

History
The station was first announced on 20 August 2010 when the 16 stations of the  Downtown line Stage 3 (DTL3) from the River Valley (now Fort Canning) to Expo stations were unveiled. The line was expected to be completed in 2017. Construction of the station and the tunnels commenced in July that year and was targeted to be completed in 2017.

Kaki Bukit Avenue 1 was closed from 28 August 2011 to 23 April 2016 to facilitate the construction of the station. The Land Transport Authority (LTA) widened the adjacent roads, Jalan Tenaga and Jalan Damai, by one lane in each direction. On 24 April 2016, selected bus routes such as 5, 15, 58, 59 and 87 were diverted to ply the reopened stretch of Kaki Bukit Avenue 1. Bus 585 continued to travel along Jalan Tenaga and Jalan Damai.

On 31 May 2017, the Land Transport Authority (LTA) announced that the station, together with the rest of DTL3, will be opened on 21 October that year. Passengers were offered a preview of the station along with the other Downtown Line 3 (DTL 3) stations at the DTL 3 Open House on 15 October.

References

External links

Railway stations in Singapore opened in 2017
Bedok
Mass Rapid Transit (Singapore) stations